The 2022 United States House of Representatives election in North Dakota was held on November 8, 2022, to elect the U.S. representative from North Dakota's at-large congressional district. The election coincided with other elections to the House of Representatives, elections to the United States Senate and various state and local elections. Incumbent Republican Kelly Armstrong was re-elected with 69.0% of the vote in 2020. His only opponent in the general election was Independent Cara Mund after Democratic nominee Mark Haugen withdrew.

Although Armstrong won by a large margin, his 62.2% showing was his worst since his first election in 2018, and Mund's 37.8% was the best showing for a non-Republican in a North Dakota U.S. House race since 2014. Mund's vote share was at least 10% higher than every 2022 statewide Democratic–NPL candidate in North Dakota and nearly 6% higher than Democrat Joe Biden's vote share in the 2020 presidential election. Mund also had the second best performance of any Independent in the 2022 congressional elections, only surpassed by Evan McMullin in the Utah Senate race.

Republican primary

Candidates

Declared
 Kelly Armstrong, incumbent U.S. Representative

Endorsements

Results

Democratic primary

Candidates

Withdrew after winning primary
Mark Haugen, student counselor and nominee for State Treasurer in 2020

Endorsements

Results

Aftermath
Following the overturning of Roe v. Wade in June 2022, Haugen faced criticism among Democrats for his anti-abortion beliefs. Many within the Democratic–NPL Party preferred independent candidate Cara Mund, who is pro-choice, and urged Haugen to drop out of the race. Haugen ended his campaign in September and the Democratic–NPL Party endorsed Mund shortly after.

Independents

Declared
Cara Mund, lawyer and former Miss America

General election

Predictions

Endorsements

Polling

Results

See also
2022 North Dakota elections

Notes

Partisan clients

References

External links
Official campaign websites
Kelly Armstrong (R) for Congress
Cara Mund (I) for Congress

2022
North Dakota
United States House of Representatives